Chlorixanthe is a genus of fruit and flower chafers in the beetle family Scarabaeidae. There are at least three described species in Chlorixanthe.

Species
These three species belong to the genus Chlorixanthe:
 Chlorixanthe chapini Cartwright, 1939
 Chlorixanthe flavoviridis (Thomson, 1860)
 Chlorixanthe propinqua (Gory & Percheron, 1833)

References

Further reading

 
 
 

Cetoniinae
Articles created by Qbugbot